Anthony Gozie Anwukah (born 1951) is a Nigerian educator, professor and was the Minister of Education for state Federal Republic of Nigeria from 2015 -2019. Before his present appointment, Anwukah previously served as Vice Chancellor of Imo State University.

Life and education
Anthony G. Anwukah was born in Oguta, Imo State. He studied English Language and Literature at the Fourah Bay College, University of Sierra Leone in early 1970s.

References

Living people
Academic staff of Imo State University
Nigerian writers
1951 births
Nigerian government officials
Buhari administration personnel